Skinnerville–Greenville Heights Historic District is a national historic district located in Greenville, North Carolina. The district encompasses 280 contributing buildings, 1 contributing site, and 1 contributing structure in a predominantly residential section of Greenville.  It includes buildings dated from about 1845 to 1955 and notable examples of Bungalow / American Craftsman and Queen Anne architecture.  Located in the district are the separately listed E. B. Ficklen House and Jesse R. Moye House. Other notable buildings include the Third Street Elementary School (1929), Glenn-Pender-Moore House (c. 1882), York-Overton House (1908), George W. and Lina Baker House (1907), Roy C. and Helen Flanagan House, Jarvis Harding House (1919), and A.G. and Pattie W. Witherington House (1948).

It was listed on the National Register of Historic Places in 2005.

References

Historic districts on the National Register of Historic Places in North Carolina
Queen Anne architecture in North Carolina
Neighborhoods in Greenville, North Carolina
National Register of Historic Places in Greenville, North Carolina